Alexei Blinov (10 July 1965 - 26 November 2019 ) was a London-based electronic engineer and new media artist working out of Raylab in Hackney. As founder of experimental new media organisation "Raylab" he has collaborated with a number of creative artists including Jamie Reid.

He was trained as a doctor before moving to the Netherlands and then the UK. In the early 1990s he specialised in large scale high quality laser projections. Since the late 1990s he has produced a wide variety of interactive audio-visual installations. Over the past few years, he has been the creative force behind many interactive audio-visual art projects in the UK.

Between 1993 and 1996 he worked extensively in the Netherlands, creating laser projections for scientific events, music and arts festivals and for dance companies. Since 1997 he has worked mainly in the UK creating interactive audio-visual installations at a number of important art galleries including the ICA, London and the Barbican Art Centre, London. Collaborations include Ciron Edwards.

From 2006-2016 he led the technical development for feature film Dau – life and times of physicist Lev Landau, on set in the Ukrainian border city Kharkov where he revisited many period experiments and engineered his own to feature in the film. The movie is one of Russia's largest and most controversial cinematic projects to date.

He engaged with new media projects based on wireless networking such as WiFi, and was a well known and respected I/O specialist with a passion for high voltage and radio frequency experimentation. Blinov was also interested in blockchain resourcing. He also researched electro stimulation of neural feedback and, in collaboration with Dau and xname, he attempted the construction of an interactive system to transmit emotions (es pain, pleasure) from the brain of a subject to the body of another (project Empathy).

He has exhibited a selection of these HT experiments including the ‘Hairpin Circuit’ at Moscow University. A set of spectacular arctic ICE core holographic images were recently exhibited in St Petersburg.

Alongside Ilze Black and Martin Howse, he was a member of TAKE2030,  a brave new media society that operated in parallel net media scheme. The London based collective produced public art projects, shifting social network missions into hypermedia playing fields. Past projects include RichAir2030, UK, EU (2003-2004) and Lets do Lunch, London (2005). Blinov had deep ties with the Open Wireless Network community between Moscow, London and Berlin, collaborating with Jamie Reid, Empress Stah, Shu Lea Cheang, Nancy Mauro-Flude and many others.

He died on 26 November 2019 following complications from pancreatic cancer.

References

External links
 Hive Networks website.
 Ray Lab 
 Dau . IMDb.

British artists
Russian artists
1964 births
2019 deaths
Laser art